Persista stands for Persatuan Sepakbola Indonesia Sintang (en: Football Association of Indonesia Sintang). Persista Sintang is an  Indonesian football club based in Sintang, West Kalimantan. Club played in Liga 3.

References

External links
Liga-Indonesia.co.id

Football clubs in Indonesia
Football clubs in West Kalimantan